The Hart–Fuller debate is an exchange between the American law professor Lon L. Fuller and his English counterpart H. L. A. Hart, published in the Harvard Law Review in 1958 on morality and law, which demonstrated the divide between the positivist and natural law philosophy. Hart took the positivist view in arguing that morality and law were separate. Fuller's reply argued for morality as the source of law's binding power.

Nazi informer case 
The debate discusses the verdict rendered by a decision of a post-war West German court on the following case:

Philosophy
Positivists believe in a separation between the law as it is and the law as it should be.  Legal rights and moral rights are not related, beyond mere coincidence. Hart believes the method of deciding cases through logic or deduction is not necessarily wrong, just as it is not necessarily right to decide cases according to social or moral aims.  Hart uses the problem of "the core and the penumbra" to illustrate the idea that laws must be related to the meaning of the words, not any natural or moral belief.  A "core" case would be one that the statute is intended to cover.  In the classic example, a statute that bans vehicles from a park is obviously intended to cover cars. A "penumbra" case would be one not considered by the creators of the law, such as a skateboard in the example above.  A judge interpreting such a law from a positivist viewpoint would look to a definition of the words in the statute. The natural law view believes that the creation of law should be based on natural laws or common morals.

See also
Hart–Dworkin debate
Legal positivism
Natural law

References

External links
 Jan Komárek: Ještě ke konferenci k padesátinám debaty mezi HLA Hartem a Lonem Fullerem 
 Aakash Singh Rathore, "Video lecture on the Hart-Fuller Debate": 

Philosophy of law
Legal disputes